Portugal's history of viticulture and vinification covers many centuries and has included the use of an extensive number native varieties. In addition, through experimentation and field trials a number of new varieties have emerged and are now playing key roles in producing the country's wide array of wines.

The relative absence of many international varieties such as Cabernet Sauvignon, Chardonnay and Semillon is another characteristic of this country's wine industry, although in recent decades many of these varieties have been brought into wider use as the lists below reveal.

Portugal's wine production in 2019 was 6.5 million hectolitres (Mhl), consistent with its annual average since 2015, and the forecast for 2020 is also 6.5 Mhl. This industry makes an important contribution to the country's annual income by attracting a vigorous local market and by being exported all over the world with France, the United States, the United Kingdom, Brazil and Germany as the main destinations. Evidence gained from recent research may suggest that the industry has not yet reached its maximum level of winegrape output efficiency.

Among other wine exporting nations, Portugal was ranked as the world's 9th largest in 2018-2019.

Identifying a variety - the problem with homonyms and synonyms
Wine grape varieties are usually known by what is called the "prime name", and it is under this name they are listed in official and academic documents such as the Vitis International Variety Catalogue (VIVC) and Kym Anderson et al.'s Which Winegrape is Grown Where?: A Global Empirical Picture.

Sometimes in a particular country, a variety may have a prime name which is different from its prime name in the international context. For example, the variety called Tempranillo or Tempranillo Tinto internationally is officially listed in Portugal as Aragonez, and is also known in different regions as Tinta Roriz or Aragonês.

Along with the prime name, the other names, that is homonyms and synonyms, by which each variety is known are also included in the lists below. These homonyms and synonyms indicate how many of the wine grape varieties grown in Portugal are known by more than one name both within the country itself and internationally. For example, the synonyms for Tinta Caiada (also called Tinta Lameira in Portugal, and known elsewhere by its Spanish name, Parraleta), listed by country of origin, are: Bonvedro, False Carignan (Australia); Espagnin Noir (France); Bastardão, Bonvedro, Bomvedro, Lambrusco de Alentejo, Monvedro, Monvedro do Algarve, Monvedro de Sines, Murteira, Olho Branco, Pau Ferro, Perrel, Preto Foz, Preto João Mendes, Tinta Caiada, Tinta Grossa, Tinta Lameira, Tintorro, Torres de Algarve (Portugal); Bonifaccencu, Bonifacienco, Carenisca, Caricagiola (Sardinia); Bastardo, Cua Tendra, Parraleta, Parrel, Salceño Negro (Spain). In an international context, some varieties have more than 200 or 300 homonyms or synonyms: over 250 for Chasselas Blanc, about 300 for Pinot Noir, and close to 350 for Moscatel Galego Branco.

Often homonyms or synonyms of a particular variety are a direct translation from one language or dialect to another. Pinot Blanc, for example, originated from France and therefore its prime name is in French, but in Italian it is called Pinot Bianco (bianco = white) and Pinot Bijeli (bijeli = white) in Croatian and languages or dialects related to Serbo-Croatian. Sometimes, when a variety originated from a particular place or has been grown there for a long time, it can be given a local name that reflects that association. Arinto, for example, has among its synonyms Arinto d'Anadia, Arinto de Bucelas, Arinto do Dão and Arinto do Douro as well as Asal Espanhol, Pé de Perdiz Branco and Terrantez de Terceira.

Further confusion has arisen when a particular homonym or synonym has been given to more than one variety. Espadeiro, for example, is the prime name for a variety; but as Wein-Plus warns, "It must not be confused with Camaraou Noir, Manseng Noir (both from France), Padeiro, Trincadeira Preta or Vinhão (all five with the synonym Espadeiro), despite the fact that they seem to share synonyms or have morphological similarities.

Probably the greatest confusion of identity has come about through misidentification, misnaming, or mislabelling. Some growers, for example, have found themselves with vines for which they have no formal identification and have based their decision on observation or even guesswork; so if the vine, grape or seasonal behaviour is similar to that of another variety, it is not surprising that the variety is given an incorrect name. The occurrence of mislabelling was also frequent in the past, especially when the gathering and exchanging of cuttings were carried out informally and without some form of control. New legislation and strict administration have reduced but not eliminated this risk.

Ampelography and the establishment of the National Ampelographic Collection
A major step in mapping and conserving Portugal's unique grape profile was the establishment in 1988 of the Coleção Ampelográfica Nacional (National Ampelographic Collection or CAN), a germplasm bank containing as many of the country's unique native varieties as have been found so far along with those varieties that have been introduced from elsewhere. The collection is located at the Instituto Nacional de Investigação Agrária e Veterinária, I.P. (National Institute for Agricultural and Veterinary Research or INIAV) in Dois Portos, and has been described as the "national reference collection" and "in addition to its preservation aspect, also has pedagogical functions and supports national and international research." 

Another of its functions was, as Eiras-Dias wrote, "to solve the problems of synonymy and homonymy spread over the different wine regions." The extent of this problem and its many causes have already been discussed above. Other examples given by Eiras-Dias are " Castelão (vs. Periquita, vs. Trincadeiro, vs. João de Santarém, vs. Castelão Francês) or Fernão Pires (vs. Maria Gomes)" with debate about the standardisation of their identity causing hot debate in the early 1980s. In his words, the widespread nature of this problem to confusion which, in turn, "had very negative effects on the knowledge and management of the rich viticultural heritage of the country."

Steps that led to the founding of CAN began in 1981 with the setting up of the Projecto Nacional de Ampelografia e Sinonímia das Variedades de Videira (National Ampelographic and Synonymous Grapevine Varieties Project or PNASVV). This just predated Portugal's accession to the European Economic Community (a precursor of the European Union (EU) into which on its establishment, EEC was absorbed) and was motivated by a need to be able to operate efficiently within the broader European context. Between PNASVV's formation and the establishment of CAN, a number of regional-based ampelographic projects began, and by the time the national collection was operating, the role and value of ampelography in the wine industry had been established. The integration of CAN with the government's legislative and administrative involvement in the wine industry was shown when CAN's listing became the core of the government's 2000 ordinance list and later revisions including the 2017 "Catálogo Nacional de Variedades de Videira" (National Catalogue of Vine Varieties or NCVV). New information from CAN continues to be provided to the government for the updating of its list, to VIVC and to the EU's certification body, the European Commission (EC).

Scientific research and the establishment of identity
In recent years, genetic testing, DNA profiling and genomics have played a major role in establishing the identity and parentage of grape varieties. Especially Jorge Böhm has to be named when it comes to the scientific research of Portuguese grape varieties, since he's well-known for his success in improving most of the native varieties by mutating new clones with his own plant nursery. But the availability of these services has been limited and largely concentrated on those varieties playing key roles in wine production. This means there is still much work to be done, leaving many varieties still clouded in mystery, and if they are varieties which have passed out of use, it seems unlikely their identities will ever be investigated.

One groundbreaking Portuguese research program carried out in the Douro-Porto regions was set up: "…to compare the effectiveness of RAPD (Random Amplified Polymorphic DNA) and ISSR (Inter Simple Sequence Repeat) molecular techniques in the detection of synonyms, homonyms and misnames. RAPD and ISSR analysis enabled the detection of 36 different band patterns, reducing in about 36% the original material. Several accessions grown under different names, between and within collections, were confirmed as the same genotype, namely Gouveio/Verdelho, Sousão Douro/Vinhão and Arinto Oeste/ Pedernã. Similarly, some homonyms/misnames were also identified, namely within Azal Tinto and Rabigato accessions. RAPD and ISSR markers revealed to be adequate molecular techniques for grapevine varieties fingerprinting with advantages over other molecular procedures, contributing for a good management of grapevine collections." The findings from this research illustrated why it has become necessary to sort out the confusion that has been caused and sustained by the use of false and misleading synonyms and homonyms. Regarding, for example, the problem with identifying Sousão (now officially known as Sezão) and Vinhão, the report said: "Results highlight the genetic proximity between Sousão and Vinhão accessions. Sousão is the prime name of a cultivar grown especially in ‘Vinhos Verdes' Region whose cultivar designation was modified to Sezão in the last review of the ‘Portuguese List of Varieties fit for Wine Production'. Vinhão has been reported as the synonym of the Spanish cultivar Sousón. However, a focus of confusion exists in Douro Region, where, frequently, the name Sousão it given to the cultivar Vinhão. Though, the observed separated RAPD clusters for Sousão and Vinhão groups are correct, nevertheless, the fact that these accessions have a miscellany of names between the two RAPD clusters and that they cluster together in the ISSR marker analysis, suggest that Sousão and Vinhão accessions are genetically close."

Further gains for the identification of varieties have been achieved through the use of microsatellites. Programs have been conducted in several regions. One of the most interesting involved a review in 2010 of 313 accessions planted at that time on CAN's own site. All of these had been authorised for commercial wine production. Of these, the researchers were able to confirm 244 as distinct genotypes, leaving 69 for further classification. Of these, 40 were subdivided into 17 distinct genotype groups each defined by shared synonyms. The largest groups was made up of Ramisco Tinto, Rabo de Ovelha Tinto, Saborinho, Molar, Tinto de Porto Santo and Tinta Negra with each of these registered at that time under two to six synonyms. In some cases, when varieties had different berry colours but shared the same Simple Sequence Repeat DNA marker) profiles (SSR), it was taken that one was a mutation of the other and they were listed together. So, for example, Fernão Pires has green-yellow berries (B) and Fernão Pires Rosado has rose berries (Rs) and Fernão Pires Rosado has rose berries (Rs), but they have the same SSR profiles and Fernão Pires Rosado is listed as a colour mutation of Fernão Pires. As the researchers said in their report:"Traditionally, cultivar characterization relied on plant morphological description. However, these observations are time consuming and error-prone due to environmental variations that may alter the expression of the measured characteristics. In the last years, developments in DNA analysis for the discrimination of cultivars through the application of the microsatellite (SSR) fingerprinting in viticulture has become the technique of choice for cultivar identification and distinction."

Another research program carried out prior to 2015 involved the use of microsatellites and SSR profiling set out to survey and correctly identify 39 less-known cultivars in the Vinhos Verdes region. As the research report says:"The accessions analyzed were identified and grouped into 34 different genotypes, nine of them referred as new genotypes. Some new synonyms were detected, namely between Spanish and Portuguese cultivars. Misidentifications and wrong designations were also detected." (p. 53) (The nine new genotype cultivars have been added to the lists below. ) Taking into account this reports closing paragraph, the findings of this research offer outcomes as significant for the Vinhos Verdes region as they could be for the country's entire wine industry:"Besides the genetic interest in the correct identification and preservation of these autochthonous and minor cultivars in order to prevent their extinction and maintain the biodiversity of Vinhos Verdes DOC Region, they could also be restored and introduced on the production of new and original wines."(p. 57)

Investigating the origin and identity of Portugal's native vines was built on the theory that those cultivars of Vitis vinifera L. ssp.vinifera, which had originated from the eastern part of the Mediterranean and been brought west by Phoenician, Greek and Roman settlers, had crossed with a pre-existing generation of wild vines from the Vitis vinifera L. ssp. sylvestris population which had either originated on the Iberian peninsula or had survived there during the last glacial period which ended approximately 11,700 years ago. Ssp. sylvestris, with common names like videira brava, videira silvestre or parreira brava, still survive in the Alentejo, Beiras and Dão forests and elsewhere on the Iberian peninsula. Various research programs made use of microsatellites along with morphological and SSR analyses and their findings are outlined in various reports, the most detailed being from Cunha et al. who concluded by saying:,"The relationships revealed between local wild-vines and local grapevine cultivars further stresses the importance of protecting the populations were this important repository of genetic variability exists, not only from a biodiversity point of view but also as a source of traits potentially useful to viticulture and oenology."

As much as Portugal has progressed in correctly identifying and indexing its grape varieties, the need for much more work remains. As Cunha and his colleagues wrote:"Normally, the winegrower is averse to the unknown in his vineyards. Either you know the true name of a grape variety or, simply, rename it, originating the existence of several names to designate a variety (synonymy) and the same name to identify different varieties (homonymy). This problem, common to all wine-growing countries, requires the adoption of an official nomenclature in which each grape variety is identified by a unique name. Exceptionally, and when justified by expressive traditions, a recognized synonym can be admitted, with an intended use equivalent."

Government legislation and an official list of names
As already indicated, in 2010, having foreseen the need for regulation, the Portuguese Government through its then-titled issued an ordinance governing the list of grape varieties that could be used in the wine industry. Subsequent revisions followed.

In 2017, incorporating new information which had come from CAN and other sources, the government issued a comprehensive document the title "Catálogo Nacional de Variedades de Videira" (National Catalogue of Vine Varieties or NCVV). Each was shown in the catalogue under the prime name by which it is required to be known within the country's commercial wine production and distribution. The right to add new varieties to the list was placed in the hands of the Instituto da Vinha e do Vinho, IP (Institute of Vine and Wine or IVV), a division of the now-called Ministério da Agricultura (Ministry of Agriculture). 

Of the 343 varieties on that list, 230 were native to Portugal or the Iberian Peninsula. But as Cunha and his colleagues warned, "There are still dozens of unidentified grape varieties in the collection (unknown), collected in vineyards subject to final grubbing up and/or for restructuring throughout the country, currently being the object of identity and definition of the strategy for its preservation." The use of genome typing for the standardising of the prime names of Portugal's grape variety list was the primary goal of Cunha and his team, and their findings are contained in that report. According to the 2010 report by Veloso et al., "Less than 15 native cultivars represent the majority of those presently utilised for viticulture, namely Alvarinho, Antão Vaz, Arinto, Fernão Pires, for the green-yellow cultivars (25,800 ha) and Baga, Castelão, Tinta Barroca, Tinto Cão, Touriga Franca, Touriga Nacional and Trincadeira (= Trincadeira Preta), for the blue-black cultivars (73,630 ha)."

Portugal's wine appellations
Portugal's wine appellation system classifies wines in three ways, Denominação de Origem Controlada (Controlled Denomination of Origin or DOC), Indicação de Proveniência Regulamentada (Indication of Regulated Provenance or IPR), and Vinho Regional (Regional Wine or VR).

The highest classification is Denominação de Origem Controlada. Under its operation, strict regulations: (1) designate the region or DOC from which a particular wine originates; (2) govern the grape varieties or castas which, having been officially listed for that region, can be used to make a wine whose label will include that region's DOC stamp; (3) protect the producers within a region from others elsewhere making false claims of origin; and (4) set the standards for each product which must be met by its producer.

Each DOC region has its own regulating body which performs these tasks and to which producers are required to submit for annual assessment samples of all their wines carrying the DOC stamp. Therefore, for example, wines produced under these regulations by Douro DOC will have on the label the words "Douro DOC" or "Douro Denominação de Origem Controlada" and this appellation conveys to the market a guarantee that the wine has been produced according to that region's standards.

For various reasons, a DOC may enter into decline and as a result may be merged with another DOC. Examples include the former Borba, Portalegre, Redondo, Reguengos and Vidigueira DOCs which are now subregions of Alentejo DOC.

From 1990, smaller regions or sub-regions within DOCs used to label their wines under a classification called Indicação de Proveniência Regulamentada (Indication of Regulated Provenance or IPR) or VQPRD (Vinho De Qualidade Produzido Em Região Demarcada or Quality Wine Produced in a Demarcated Region) and either IPR or VQPRD. These regions set up their own internal regulating bodies similar to these operating in DOCs, and often their plan was to develop their own identity and quality of output to an extent that would lead, in turn, to their being recognised as a DOC.

The third appellation is Vinho Regional (Regional Wine). As Wines of Portugal points out: "Rules for making Vinho Regional are much less stringent than those that govern DOC wines. Nevertheless, many prestigious Portuguese wines are classified as Vinho Regional. This is often because the producer has chosen to use grape varieties that are not permitted for the local DOC, or at least not in those particular combinations or proportions. The looser regulations for Vinho Regional give producers greater scope for individuality, although these wines still have to fulfil certain criteria regarding grape variety, minimum alcohol content and so on."

As it happens, the DOC and VR systems can and do operate side by side in relation to specific regions. Therefore, the Alentejo region has Alentejo DOC and Alentejano VR designations, while in the Douro region there are Douro DOC and Duriense VR designations. Therefore, a variety may appear on different levels of listing, that is to say on both the DOC and VR lists because this allows for that variety to be used in different ways. In turn, this would govern the type of stamp the producer can use on the label of a specific wine.

Portugal's base category of wines was once known as vinho de mesa (table wine) but these days is more often called simply vinho or vinho de Portugal. These may be produced using grape juice from anywhere in the country or from elsewhere, there is not the same level of control on standards as applied in DOC and VR wines, and the label usually only carries the producer's name, either the product's name or the grape varieties used in it and the words "Product of Portugal".

European Union wine appellations

Geographical Indication or the association of a product with a specific place or region has had a long history at a national level in Europe. In 1992 the EU formalised this process under its own regulations with a certification process to be administered by the EC.

In devising its certification regulations, EU modelled it on Portugal's DOC system, France's Appellation d'origine contrôlée (Controlled Designation of Origin or AOC), Italy's Denominazione di origine controllata (Controlled Designation of Origin or DOC), Spain's Denominación de origen (Denomination of Origin or DO), and those of other EU members. As with Portugal and each other wine-producing member of the EU, internal systems operate in parallel with EU's, and those varieties that appear on internal lists also appear on the equivalent EU lists.

Under EU's regulations, there are three categories of certification which are explained as follows:

 "Protected Designation of Origin" (PDO) – "Product names registered as PDO are those that have the strongest links to the place in which they are made."; 
 "Protected Geographical Indication" (PGI) – "PGI emphasises the relationship between the specific geographic region and the name of the product, where a particular quality, reputation or other characteristic is essentially attributable to its geographical origin", and "Geographical Indication" of spirit drinks and aromatised wines" (GI) – "The GI protects the name of a spirit drink or aromatised wine originating in a country, region or locality where the product's particular quality, reputation or other characteristic is essentially attributable to its geographical origin.";
 "Traditional Specialities Guaranteed" (TSG) – "Traditional speciality guaranteed (TSG) highlights the traditional aspects such as the way the product is made or its composition, without being linked to a specific geographical area. The name of a product being registered as a TSG protects it against falsification and misuse."

Each of the categories is represented by a stamp and when appellation has been authorised under EU's regulations, wine producers are entitled to show the appropriate stamp on their labelling. Regarding Portugal's wine industry, reports say that the majority of producers are continuing to use only the country's own internal appellation categories on their labels.

Because Portugal's Instituto da Vinha e do Vinho, IP (Institute of Vine and Wine or IVV), which operates under the supervision of the currently-called Ministério da Agricultura (Ministry of Agriculture), uses only EU's appellation terminology, the tables below are set up in the same way except where alternatives are necessary.

Lists of wine grape varieties 
For an explanation of techniques used for the investigation of a variety's genetic structure and the determination of its pedigree, see Myles, et al. "Genetic structure and domestication history of the grape."

Red varieties 
Abbreviations
 CAN -  Coleção Ampelográfica Nacional (National Ampelographic Collection)
 Color of Berry Skin - N (noir - black), Rg (rouge - red), Rs (rose - pale red or pink), Gr (gris - gray or greyish - blue) 
 FPS - Foundation Plant Service Grape Registry
 ha - hectare, a measurement of land area
 NCVV - Catálogo Nacional de Variedades de Videira (National Catalogue of Vine Varieties)
 VIVC - Vitis International Variety Catalogue
 WPL - Wein.Plus Lexicon

White varieties
Abbreviations
 CAN - Coleção Ampelográfica Nacional (National Ampelographic Collection)
 Colour of Berry Skin – B (blanc – yellow or green)
 FPS – Foundation Plant Service Grape Registry
 ha - hectare, a measurement of land area
 NCVV – '"Catálogo Nacional de Variedades de Videira" (National Catalogue of Vine Varieties)
 VIVC – Vitis International Variety Catalogue
 WPL – Wein.Plus Lexicon

Other recommended lists
 Castas portuguesas (Portuguese varieties) (In Portuguese)
 List of Port wine grapes
 Regiões (Regions)

Notes

References

Supplemental references used for charts
 "Catálogo Nacional de Variedades de Videira" (National Catalogue of Vine Varieties or NCVV). Direção-Geral de Alimentação e Veterinária, Ministério da Agricultura, Florestas e Desenvolvimento Rural (Directorate-General for Food and Animal Health, Ministry of Agriculture, Forestry and Rural Development). 2017. Accessed 18 January 2021.
 Cunha, Jorge Manuel Martins, João Brazão, Margarida Teixeira-Santos, José Eduardo Eiras-Dias, P. Fevereiro, Jose Miguel Martinez-Zapater, et al. "A identidade das castas de videira portuguesas aptas à produção de vinho no contexto ibérico e europeu. O uso de marcadores moleculares do tipo SNP para a sua discriminação" (The identity of Portuguese grape varieties suitable for wine production in the Iberian and European context. The use of molecular markers of the SNP type for their discrimination), Instituto Nacional de Investigação Agrária e Veterinãria (National Institute for Agricultural and Veterinary Research or INIAV), January/February/March 2017. p. 18. Accessed 24 December 2020.
 Ferreira, Vanessa, Olinda Pinto-Carnide, Teresa Mota, Juan Pedro Martin, Jéus M Ortiz and Isaura Castro. "Identification of minority grapevine cultivars from Vinhos Verdes Portuguese DOC Region." Vitis, Vol 54 (Special edition), 2015. p. 55. Available on ResearchGate at Accessed 1 February 2021.
 "FPS Grape Registry: Grapevine Varieties." Foundation Plant Services, College of Agricultural and Environmental Sciences, University of California, Davis. Accessed 23 February 2020.
 "Guide to Portuguese Grape Varieties". Cellar Tours. Accessed 13 November 2009.
 "Lista da Castas" (List of Grape Varieties). Instituto da Vinha e do Vinho, I.P. 2018.. Accessed 20 February 2020.
 Maul, Erika, et al. "Vitis International Variety Catalogue" (VIVC). Julius Kühn-Institut - Federal Research Centre for Cultivated Plants (JKI), Institute for Grapevine Breeding. 2020. Accessed 23 February 2020.
 Mayson, Richard. The Wines of Portugal. Infinite Ideas, 2019. 
 Robinson, Jancis. Vines, Grapes & Wines, pp. 215–219 & 246-249. Mitchell Beazley, 1986. .
 Robinson and Julia Harding, et al. The Oxford Companion to Wine. 4th Edition. Edited by Jancis Robinson and Julia Harding. Oxford University Press, 2015. 
 Robinson, Harding and José Vouillamoz. Wine Grapes: A complete guide to 1,368 vine varieties, including their origins and flavours. HarperCollins, 2013. . Access available online at Apple Books. . Accessed 20 February 2020. (NB When viewing this text online, the page numbering varies depending on the settings in View. All grape varieties are listed alphabetically.)
 Tischelmayer, Norbert, et al. Glossary. Wein.Plus (WPL). Accessed 20 February 2020.

Bibliography
 Anderson, Kym, and Signe Nelgen. Which Winegrape is Grown Where?: A Global Empirical Picture, Revised Edition. Edited by Kym Anderson and N R Aryal. University of Adelaide Press, 2020.  Published online 2020. . 
 Castro, Isauro, Olinda Pinto-Carnide, Jesús-María Ortiz, Vanessa Ferreira and Juan Pedro Martín. "A comparative analysis of genetic diversity in Portuguese grape germplasm from ampelographic collections fit for quality wine production." Spanish Journal of Agricultural Research, Volume 14, Issue 4, 2016. pp. 1-11.  Available online at ResearchGate.  Accessed 3 January 2021.
 "Catálogo Nacional de Variedades de Videira" (National Catalogue of Vine Varieties or NCVV). Direção-Geral de Alimentação e Veterinária, Ministério da Agricultura, Florestas e Desenvolvimento Rural (Directorate-General for Food and Animal Health, Ministry of Agriculture, Forestry and Rural Development). 2017.
 Cunha, Jorge Manuel Martins, João Brazão, Margarida Teixeira-Santos, José Eduardo Eiras-Dias, P. Fevereiro, Jose Miguel Martinez-Zapater, et al. "A identidade das castas de videira portuguesas aptas à produção de vinho no contexto ibérico e europeu. O uso de marcadores moleculares do tipo SNP para a sua discriminação" (The identity of Portuguese grape varieties suitable for wine production in the Iberian and European context. The use of molecular markers of the SNP type for their discrimination), Instituto Nacional de Investigação Agrária e Veterinãria (National Institute for Agricultural and Veterinary Research or INIAV), January/February/March 2017.
 Ferreira, Vanessa, Olinda Pinto-Carnide, Teresa Mota, Juan Pedro Martin, Jéus M Ortiz and Isaura Castro. "Identification of minority grapevine cultivars from Vinhos Verdes Portuguese DOC Region." Vitis, Vol 54 (Special edition), 2015. p. 55. Available online at ResearchGate at 
 Mayson, Richard. The Wines of Portugal. Infinite Ideas, 2019. 
 Santos, Micael Queiroga dos, Xosé Antón Rodríguez, Ana Alexandra Marta-Costa. "Efficiency analysis of viticulture systems in the Portuguese Douro region." International Journal of Wine Business Research, Vol 32 No 4, 2020. pp. 573-591. Acvailable online at ResearchGate.  
 Oczkowski, Eddie. "The strategic use of synonyms for varietal names in labelling." Winetitles Media, November 2018.
 Robinson, Jancis. Vines, Grapes & Wines. Mitchell Beazley, 1986. .
 Robinson and Julia Harding, et al. The Oxford Companion to Wine. 4th Edition. Edited by Jancis Robinson and Julia Harding. Oxford University Press, 2015. 
 Robinson, Harding and José Vouillamoz. Wine Grapes: A complete guide to 1,368 vine varieties, including their origins and flavours. HarperCollins, 2013. . Available online at Apple Books. .

External links
 Anderson, Kym, and Signe Nelgen. Which Winegrape is Grown Where?: A Global Empirical Picture, Revised Edition. Edited by Kym Anderson and N R Aryal. University of Adelaide Press, 2020.  Published online 2020. . Accessed 2 February 2021.
 "Catálogo Nacional de Variedades de Videira" (National Catalogue of Vine Varieties (NCVV). Direção-Geral de Alimentação e Veterinária, Ministério da Agricultura, Florestas e Desenvolvimento Rural (Directorate-General for Food and Animal Health, Ministry of Agriculture, Forestry and Rural Development). 2017. Accessed 18 January 2021.
 "FPS Grape Registry: Grapevine Varieties". Foundation Plant Services, College of Agricultural and Environmental Sciences, University of California, Davis. Accessed 23 February 2020.
 Infovini. Accessed 5 March 2020.
 Instituto da Vinha e do Vinho. (IVV). Accessed 16 February 2020.
 Maul, Erika, et al. "Vitis International Variety Catalogue" (VIVC), Julius Kühn-Institut - Federal Research Centre for Cultivated Plants (JKI). 2020. Accessed 23 February 2020.
 Robinson, Harding and José Vouillamoz. Wine Grapes: A complete guide to 1,368 vine varieties, including their origins and flavours. HarperCollins, 2013. . Available online at Apple Books. . Accessed 20 February 2020. (NB When viewing this text online, the page numbering varies depending on the settings in View. All grape varieties are listed alphabetically.)
 Tischelmayer, Norbert, et al. Wein.Plus. Accessed 20 February 2020.
 Wines of Portugal. Accessed 5 March 2020.

Grape
Vitis
Portuguese wine

Wine-related lists